Royale Union Saint-Gilloise , abbreviated to Union SG or USG, unofficially simply called Union, is a Belgian football club originally located in the municipality of Saint-Gilles, in Brussels, although since the 1920s it has been based at the Joseph Marien Stadium in the neighbouring municipality of Forest.

The club is one of the most successful in the history of Belgian football. The club won eleven Belgian championships between 1904 and 1935, making it the most successful Belgian club before World War II. The team colours are blue and yellow and its matricule is 10. The team was traditionally popular with working class communities of southern Brussels.

On 13 March 2021, after defeating local rivals R.W.D. Molenbeek, Union was promoted back to the Belgian First Division A, marking its first appearance in top-flight football in 48 years. The following year, they finished top of the table at the end of the regular season, the first club in Belgian history to do so the season after promotion to the top flight. Union would go on to finish second in the champions play off, securing Champions League qualification for the first time ever in club history, and after being eliminated in the third qualifying round, secured a spot in the group stage of the Europa League.

History
The club was founded in 1897 and obtained its first of eleven titles as Champion of Belgium in 1904. From 1933 to 1935 the team played 60 consecutive matches undefeated, setting a still unbeaten record in Belgium. In the early 1900s, the club also had a dominant spell in some of the very first "European" Cup competitions that took place, prior to officially sanctioned UEFA competitions.

Between 1958 and 1965 the club had a brief spell of European success, playing in the Inter-Cities Fairs Cup, reaching the semi-finals in the 1958–60 edition after a two legged victory against A.S. Roma. In 1963, however, the club was relegated to the second division, and in 1980 even fell as low as the Belgian Promotion division.

On 21 May 2018, Tony Bloom, chairman of English Premier League side, Brighton & Hove Albion was confirmed as the majority shareholder. Alex Muzio, the Chairman of Union, was a co-investor with Tony Bloom in 2018 and holds a minority interest in the club.

On 13 March 2021, after defeating R.W.D. Molenbeek 2–1 at home, Union were promoted back to the Belgian First Division A. This marked its first appearance in the top flight since 1972. Due to restrictions at the time due to the COVID-19 pandemic, Union fans were not able to celebrate their promotion at the stadium.

On 10 April 2022, during their first season back in the top flight in 49 years, Union Saint-Gilloise finished the regular season in first place after a draw against last place Beerschot. The match was abandoned after 83 minutes, after Beerschot fans threw flares onto the pitch. Union were later awarded three points due to forfeit. This was the first time that a newly promoted club finished top of the table in the history of the Belgian league. In the champions play-off, Union finished second behind Club Brugge and thus qualified for the qualifying rounds of the Champions League for the first time in club history.

Supporters and rivalries

Union attract supporters primarily from the Brussels region, especially from the south of the Belgian capital. Their ultras are known as the Union Bhoys, and attend in the all-standing Tribune Est. The Union Bhoys have friendships with RFC Liège and Cercle Brugge supporters. Union's supporters promote anti-fascist ideals.

Union share a Brussels city derby, also known as a "Zwanze derby" with R.W.D. Molenbeek, which stems from their old rivalry with Daring Club Brussels, that has been encapsulated in the Brussels play Bossemans et Coppenolle. However, the two are said to have a love-hate relationship, having both experienced financial difficulty in the modern era, and organised friendlies together in support.

Union have another Brussels city rivalry with neighbour RSC Anderlecht, although the two have met even fewer times in the modern era than RWDM and Union have. This is arguably Union's fiercest derby, with many fans considering it to be the most important match of the season. They met for the first time since 1979 in the Belgian Cup in 2018, with Union stunning Anderlecht 3–0 at the Constant Vanden Stock Stadium. In 2021, Union were promoted to the First Division for the first time in 49 years. In the first derby between the two teams in the championship, Union beat Anderlecht 3–1. In January 2022, in their first home game against Anderlecht in the championship since their relegation in 1972, Union completed a league double over Anderlecht, defeating them 1–0. During the Champions Playoffs at the end of the 2021–22 season, they again defeated Anderlecht twice, first with a 3–1 home victory and again with a 0–2 away victory.

Players

Personnel achievements 

Six players from the Union Saint-Gilloise finished top scorers in the Belgian First Division A

 1902/1903:  Gustave Vanderstappen (? Goals)
 1903/1904:  Gustave Vanderstappen (30 Goals)
1909/1910:  Maurice Vertongen (36 Goals) 
1922/1923:  Achille Meyskens (24 Goals) 
1933/1934:  Vital Van Landeghem (29 Goals) 
2021/2022:  Deniz Undav (26 Goals)

A player from the Union Saint-Gilloise finishes top scorers in the Belgian Second Division

1950/1951:  Frans Laureys (28 Goals)

Current squad

Out on loan

Staff
Sports director
  Chris O'Loughlin

Head coach
  Karel Geraerts

Assistant coach
  Bart Meert

Assistant coach
  Artur Kopyt

Assistant coach
  Tim Smolders

Goalkeeping coach
  Logan Bailly

Fitness coach
  Balder Berckmans

Video analyst
  Marc Delcourt

Team manager
  Annelies Menten

Delegate
  Philippe Wery

Medical
Doctors
  Koen Pansaers
  Axel Marlaire

Physios
  Stephen Van den Berg
  Ivan Del Molino
  Wilfried Schiemsky

Honours

Domestic
Belgian First Division
Winners (11): 1903–04, 1904–05, 1905–06, 1906–07, 1908–09, 1909–10, 1912–13, 1922–23, 1932–33, 1933–34, 1934–35
Runners-up (9): 1902–03, 1907–08, 1911–12, 1913–14, 1919–20, 1920–21, 1921–22, 1923–24, 2021–22
Belgian Second Division/Challenger Pro League
Winners (4): 1900–1901, 1950–1951, 1963–64, 2020–21
Runners-up (1): 1967–68
Belgian Third Division A
Winners (2): 1975–76, 1983–84
Belgian Third Division B
Winners (1): 2003–04
Belgian Fourth Division
Winners (1): 1982-1983
Belgian Cup
Winners (2): 1912–13, 1913–14
Jules Pappaert Cup
Winners (3): 1956, 1976, 2021

European
Challenge International du Nord
Winners (3): 1904, 1905, 1907
Runners-up (1): 1908
Coupe Van der Straeten Ponthoz
Winners (3): 1905, 1906, 1907
Runners-up (1): 1904
Coupe Jean Dupuich
Winners (4): 1912, 1913, 1914, 1925
Runners-up (1): 1908

Union SG in European competition
Union Saint-Gilloise went 58 years between appearances in European competitions, entering the 2022–23 UEFA Champions League in the 3rd Qualifying Round, having last appeared in the 1964–65 Inter-Cities Fairs Cup. The team is playing their home games at Den Dreef, as the Joseph Marien Stadium does not meet the UEFA requirements.

See also
Christophe Goumotsios
 The Invincibles

Notes

References

External links
 Official website

 
Football clubs in Brussels
Association football clubs established in 1897
Football clubs in Belgium
1897 establishments in Belgium
Organisations based in Belgium with royal patronage
Royale Union Saint-Gilloise
Royale Union Saint-Gilloise
Belgian Pro League clubs